E-MU 20K is the commercial name for a line of audio chips by Creative Technology, commercially known as the Sound Blaster X-Fi chipset. The series comprises the E-MU 20K1 (CA20K1) and E-MU 20K2 (CA20K2) audio chips.

The 20K1 chip was launched in August 2005, and ever since it has been used in a variety of audio solutions from Creative, and more recently third-party manufacturers, such as Auzentech and Audiotrak.

The audio processor on X-Fi  was the most powerful at its time of release, offering an extremely robust sample rate conversion (SRC) engine in addition to enhanced internal sound channel routing options and greater 3D audio enhancement capabilities. A significant portion of the audio processing unit was devoted to this resampling engine. The SRC engine was far more capable than previous Creative sound card offerings, a limitation that had been a major thorn in Creative's side. Most digital audio is sampled at 44.1 kHz, a standard no doubt related to CD-DA, while sound cards were often designed to process audio at 48 kHz. So, the 44.1 kHz audio must be resampled to 48 kHz (Creative's previous cards' DSPs operated at 48 kHz) for the audio DSP to be able to process and affect it. A poor resampling implementation introduces artifacts into the audio which can be heard, and measured as higher intermodulation distortion, within higher frequencies (generally 16 kHz and up). X-Fi's resampling engine produces a near-lossless-quality result, far exceeding any known audio card DSP available at the time of release. This functionality is used not only for simple audio playback, but for several other features of the card such as the "", a technology that claims to improve the clarity of digital music through digital analysis (supported by all X-Fi models, including the Xtreme Audio and X-Mod).

The X-Fi name has also been applied to cards based on the CA0106 and CA0110 chips, which belong to the previous generation Live!/Audigy series.

Specifications 

The 130 nm, 51 million transistors audio processor operates at 400 MHz and its computational power is estimated at 10,000 MIPS, which is about 24 times higher than the estimated performance of its predecessor – the Audigy processor. E-MU 20K features the Quartet DSP, a set of 4 identical digital signal processors interconnected with a wide ring bus.

The CA20K1 chip is a slave processor which requires a host CPU to control it.  The CA20K2 adds an embedded RISC processor which controls the audio part; this configuration safeguards against the audio latency of its PCI Express interface. 20K2 also has more I/O ports, a DDR SDRAM memory interface, and a built-in Universal Audio Architecture component.

A big improvement in the X-Fi DSP over the previous Audigy design, is the complete overhaul of the resampling engine on the card. The previous Audigy cards had their DSPs locked at 48 kHz/16-bit, meaning any content that didn't match this format had to be resampled on the card in hardware, which resulted in serious intermodulation distortion. For the X-Fi, Creative completely rewrote the resampling engine and dedicated more than half of the power of the DSP to the process, resulting in a very clean resample. Furthermore, in "Audio Creation mode" with "bit-matched playback" option, the X-Fi can work with real 44,100 Hz sample rate without any kind of resampling or other signal processing.

Applications

Sound Blaster X-Fi series

Third party

 Auzentech mentions only the DAC's ideal theoretical SNR being 120 dB (AKM AK-4396).

See also
AMD TrueAudio

References

External links
OEM - Chips, creative.com

Creative Technology products
Audio acceleration